HMS Sultan was a 74-gun third rate ship of the line of the Royal Navy, launched on 19 September 1807 at Deptford Wharf.

In 1809, she took part in the Battle of Maguelone while captained by Edward Griffith.

On 10 October 1814 Sultan was escorting some transports when  wrecked at Beerhaven. The troops consisted of 200 men from the 40th Regiment of Foot.

Fate
Sultan became a receiving ship in 1860, and was broken up in 1864.

Citations

References

Grocott, Terence (1997) Shipwrecks of the revolutionary & Napoleonic eras (Chatham). 
Lavery, Brian (2003) The Ship of the Line - Volume 1: The development of the battlefleet 1650-1850. Conway Maritime Press. .

Ships of the line of the Royal Navy
Fame-class ships of the line
1807 ships
Ships built in Deptford